Safir Eshgh ( translit. "Love Ambassador") is a third-person action adventure video game made by Iranian center for digital Islamic revolution publishing.

The story is set in the year 61 AH about "Mehran" of Rey an Iranian man who is suffering from past trauma and...

See also 

 List of Iranian video games

References

External links 
 

Windows games
Action video games
2020 video games
Hack and slash games
Video games developed in Iran